Jake in a Box is a 4-CD box set retrospective of the songs of Jake Thackray, recorded by EMI from 1967 to 1976. It includes his four studio albums, The Last Will and Testament of Jake Thackray (1967), Jake's Progress (1969), Bantam Cock (1972) and On Again! On Again! (1977), and six singles, digitally remastered, plus outtakes from the Last Will and Testament sessions, and songs recorded for an abandoned album in 1970.

Track listing

External links
Review at High Hat

Jake Thackray albums
2006 compilation albums
Albums produced by Norman Newell
EMI Records compilation albums